Mary Gehring is an American plant biologist and epigeneticist who has published extensively on genomic imprinting and demethylation in Arabidopsis thaliana. She has led a laboratory focused on epigenetics at the Whitehead Institute since 2010 and is an associate professor in the biology department at MIT. Gehring graduated from Williams College and received her PhD in 2005 from University of California, Berkeley, where she worked with Robert L. Fischer.

Gehring did postdoctoral research with Steven Henikoff at the Fred Hutchinson Cancer Research Center and was a Pew Scholar in the Biomedical Sciences. She was chosen as one of Cells 40 under 40 for the journal's 40th anniversary.

She cites Marie Curie as the one scientist who most fascinated her, and credits "[w]anting to help feed the world" as the inspiration for getting into plant biology.

References

External links 

Past and present lab members

Living people
21st-century American botanists
American geneticists
American women botanists
Massachusetts Institute of Technology School of Science faculty
Whitehead Institute faculty
Year of birth missing (living people)
University of California, Berkeley alumni
Williams College alumni
Epigeneticists
American women geneticists
Place of birth missing (living people)
Fred Hutchinson Cancer Research Center people
21st-century American women scientists